Senemoğlu is a village in the Ortaköy District of Çorum Province in Turkey. Its population is 159 (2021).

References

Villages in Ortaköy District, Çorum